Affonso Celso Pastore (born 19 June 1938
) is a Brazilian economist and former president of the Brazilian Central Bank (1983–1985), having also been Secretary of the São Paulo Treasury Department.

He serves as Latin Source's economist in Brazil and is president and Founder of A.C. Pastore & Associados, an economic consulting firm based in São Paulo. Pastore serves as Brazil advisor for Latin Source, a network of independent advisors.

Pastore was President of the Central Bank of Brazil from 5 September 1983 to 14 March 1985 when the President of Brazil was João Baptista Figueiredo. He previously served as Secretary of Finance for the State of São Paulo from March 1979 to March 1983 when the Governors of São Paulo were Paulo Salim Maluf and José Maria Marin. Prior to that was Director of Research for the Instituto de Pesquisas Econômicas, a foundation associated with the Department of Economics at the University of São Paulo. He also served as Director of Research at the Fundação Centro de Estudos do Comércio Exterior (FUNCEX).

Pastore received both his Bachelor and his Doctorate degrees in economics from the Universidade de São Paulo, where he held the positions of Professor and Dean of the Department of Economics from 1978 to 1999. He continues teaching graduate courses at the Fundação Getulio Vargas/RJ on "Open Economy Macroeconomics", "Money and Banking" and "Econometrics".

Bibliography

References

External links

 A. C. Pastore & Associados
  Site of the Brazilian central bank

Brazilian economists
Presidents of the Central Bank of Brazil
Living people
1939 births
Brazilian educators
Brazilian people of Italian descent
People associated with the University of São Paulo
Academic staff of Fundação Getulio Vargas